Óli Valur Ómarsson (born 9 January 2003) is an Icelandic footballer who plays as a right-back for Swedish club Sirius.

Club career
He made his debut for Stjarnan as a substitute against ÍBV in the last round of the 2019 season, aged 16. After establishing himself with Stjarnan he was sold to Sirius on 13 July 2022, signing a 5-year contract and making his Allsvenskan debut coming on as a substitute against Degerfors on 17 July 2022.

International career
He has featured for the Icelandic U15, U16, U17, U19 and U21 youth sides.

References

External links
 
 

2003 births
Living people
Oli Valur Omarsson
Oli Valur Omarsson
Oli Valur Omarsson
Association football defenders
Oli Valur Omarsson
Allsvenskan players
Oli Valur Omarsson
IK Sirius Fotboll players
Oli Valur Omarsson
Expatriate footballers in Sweden
Oli Valur Omarsson